Zareh Kalfayan (1887 in Constantinople, Ottoman Empire – 1939 in Paris, France) was an Ottoman painter of Armenian descent.

Life 

Zareh Kalfayan was born in Constantinople to Armenian parents. He attended the local art school. He began to teach art at the Getronagan Armenian Lyceum. His paintings were first exhibited in Istanbul. His notable works include Evening at Dolmabahce, Misty Morning at Tophane, and Sunrise and Rumelihisari. In 1922 Kalfayan went to Paris, where he enrolled at the Academy of Fine Arts. He later held several exhibitions. For a time he served as president of the Society of Freelance Armenian Painters. In later life he painted mainly miniatures.

References 

1887 births
1939 deaths
20th-century painters from the Ottoman Empire
Armenians from the Ottoman Empire
Artists from Istanbul
20th-century Armenian painters
Emigrants from the Ottoman Empire to France